The 1996–1997 Úrvalsdeild kvenna was the 40th season of the top-tier women's basketball league in Iceland. The season started on 5 October 1996 and ended on 27 March 1997. Grindavík won its 1st title after sweeping defending champions Keflavík 2–0 in the semi-finals and KR 3–0 in the Finals.

Competition format
The participating teams first played a conventional round-robin schedule with every team playing each opponent twice "home" and twice "away" for a total of 18 games. The top four teams qualified for the championship playoffs while the bottom team was relegated to the second-tier Division I.

Regular season

Playoffs

Bracket

Semifinals

|}

Final

|}

Source: 1997 playoffs

Awards
All official awards of the 1996–97 season.

Domestic Player of the Year

Domestic All-First Team

Best Young Player Award

Best Coach

Source

References

External links
Official Icelandic Basketball Federation website

Icelandic
Lea
Úrvalsdeild kvenna seasons (basketball)